Wilsonville High School is a four-year suburban, public high school in Wilsonville, Oregon, United States. Part of the West Linn-Wilsonville School district, Wilsonville HS opened in 1995 and has grown steadily to its current population of just over 1200 students. It offers a wide variety of academic programs, sports, and extracurricular activities as well as a thriving art program. The student body makeup is 52 percent male and 48 percent female, and the total minority enrollment is 26 percent.

This is the first and only high school in Wilsonville. Before 1995, students had to either take a bus to West Linn to attend West Linn High School, or go to a neighboring town’s high school. Wilsonville high school was referred to as "high tech high" when it opened in 1995, Wilsonville High School was praised for providing network computers in each classroom and internet access for all students.

Academics
In 2016, Wilsonville High School received a silver ranking from U.S. News & World Report, and was ranked 7th in the state. Standardized test scores show Wilsonville above the state average in reading, writing, math and science.

References 

 Adam Guenther, "The Coolest Football Coach Ever", The Oregonian, October 1, 2010.
 "Your Schools." Wilsonville High School, The Oregonian. Accessed 2 Nov. 2016.
“Kelly Schmidt Named WHS Principal” Wilsonville High School, Pamplin Media Group

External links
 Wilsonville High School website

Educational institutions established in 1995
Buildings and structures in Wilsonville, Oregon
High schools in Clackamas County, Oregon
Public high schools in Oregon
1995 establishments in Oregon